District courts in Nepal are the third layer of court after Supreme Court and High Courts. Each district in Nepal has a district court.

Clause 148, 149, 150 and 151 of Constitution of Nepal, 2015 defines District Courts, appointment, qualification, terms and remuneration of chief justices.

List of District Courts

References

Courts in Nepal
Districts of Nepal